The Little Falls Hydroelectric Power Plant, on the Spokane River near Reardan, Washington, about  west of Spokane was built during 1907–10. It was listed on the National Register of Historic Places in 1988. The area spans the border of Lincoln County, Washington and Stevens County, Washington.

It includes a  dam.

It was described as "a significant low head hydroelectric installation from the early 20th century. Built in 1907-1910, the plant was the first
large-scale regional generating facility constructed by the Washington Water Power Company. As such, the plant was critical to the growth of industry and agriculture in the Inland Empire. In addition, the powerhouse is an architecturally significant example of industrial design from the period."

See also
Long Lake Hydroelectric Power Plant, also built by the Washington Water Power Co. on the Spokane River and NRHP-listed

References

External links

Dams in Washington (state)
National Register of Historic Places in Lincoln County, Washington
National Register of Historic Places in Stevens County, Washington
Neoclassical architecture in Washington (state)
Buildings and structures completed in 1910